Richmond High School can refer to one of these schools:

Australia
Richmond High School (New South Wales)
Richmond High School (Victoria)

Canada
Richmond Secondary School in Richmond, British Columbia

United Kingdom
Richmond School, Richmond, North Yorkshire, one of whose constituent schools was Richmond High School for Girls

United States
Richmond High School (Richmond, California)
Richmond-Burton Community High School, Illinois
Richmond High School (Richmond, Indiana)
Richmond High School (Richmond, Kentucky), a defunct historically segregated African-American school
Richmond High School (Richmond, Michigan)
Richmond High School (Missouri) in Richmond, Missouri
Richmond Community High School in Richmond, Virginia
Richmond High School (Richmond, Virginia), defunct